, known professionally as , is a Japanese actor, creative director, and writer. He appeared in a number of Japanese TV dramas, including Mei-chan no Shitsuji, Hanazakari no Kimitachi e and Zettai Kareshi. Additionally, he was well known as the protagonist Souji Tendo in the tokusatsu series Kamen Rider Kabuto. Mizushima serves as the co-producer, co-screenwriter and leading actor for the latest film Black Butler which is the live-action film adaptation of the popular manga. His birth name "Tomohiro Saito" is being credited as co-producer in the film.

Under his pen name , he wrote his first novel, Kagerou, which was chosen as the winner of the 5th Popular Publishing Grand Prize for Fiction and was published in 2010.

Career
Mizushima first appeared on Japanese television in 2005, where he played Hiro Misawa, a minor character in the second season of Gokusen. In the same year, he found guest starring roles in Japanese dramas such as Ame to Yume no Ato ni and a small role in the TBS drama Brother Beat.

In 2006, Mizushima became a main character in the series Kamen Rider Kabuto and acted in the lead role in the film Kamen Rider Kabuto: God Speed Love.

Beginning in 2007, Mizushima began taking on bigger roles in more high-profile productions, such as the supporting role of the girl-crazy Minami Nanba in Hanazakari no Kimitachi e and the main role of Soshi Asamoto in Zettai Kareshi in 2008. Both dramas were among the most popular dramas of Japan at the time of their airing. Mizushima also provided the voice of Bruce Banner in the Japanese dub of The Incredible Hulk. Mizushima took the role of Jiro Mori in the 2008 TV drama Room of King.

In 2009, he starred in the drama Mei-chan no Shitsuji as Rihito Shibata, a perfect butler. In the same year, he landed the role of Toranosuke Hayashida in the drama Mr. Brain in which he played a detective's assistant. Later that year, Mizushima starred alongside Shun Oguri in the drama Tokyo Dogs, playing a detective who is a hot-blooded fighting expert due to his earlier days as a delinquent. He also starred in the feature film Drop in the same year in the role of Tatsuya Iguchi, a middle school student in a delinquent gang.

In 2010, Mizushima landed the role of Ryusuke Minami in the film Beck, in which once again acted alongside Mei-chan no Shitsuji co-star Takeru Satoh.

In September 2010, Mizushima left his talent agency, Ken-On, to create an own independent agency called A Station. Several weeks later, on 31 October 2010, it was announced that Mizushima had won the 5th Poplar Publishing Grand Prize for Fiction and a cash prize of 20 million yen for his debut work, titled Kagerou, written under the pen name  but he decided to decline the 20 million yen prize money. The book was published in December 2010. In the two and a half years of Oricon's book charts, Kagerou recorded the third highest first-week sales, behind J. K. Rowling's Harry Potter and the Deathly Hallows (1.191 million) and Haruki Murakami's 1Q84 Book 3 (398,000).

In 2014, Mizushima starred as Sebastian Michaelis in the film Black Butler, in which he also serves as the co-screenwriter and co-producer. The film will be shown at Toronto Japanese Film Festival and Brussels International Fantastic Film Festival 2014.

In August 2015, Mizushima has been cast to appear in the 5th season of HBO's Girls, which aired on 2016. This is his first international TV appearance.

On January 14, 2020, Hiro was announced as an ambassador of the upcoming eight installment of Shimajiro 3D CGI animated movie, which will be released on February 28, 2020.

Personal life
Mizushima is bilingual, being fluent in English and Japanese. He spent his whole elementary school years (1990 to 1996) in Zurich, Switzerland. He was bullied and discriminated as a child at International School in Switzerland. When he came back to Japan, he attended the junior high school and the high school of Toin Gakuen, and belonged to the soccer club of the school. When he was in the twelfth grade, he worked as a regular midfielder in The 81st All Japan High School Soccer Tournament.

Mizushima graduated from Keio University and has a degree in Environmental Information.

He married Japanese pop singer Ayaka on 22 February 2009. In December 2014, the couple announced through their agency that they are expecting their first child. In June 2015, Mizushima announced via Instagram that he had become a father. The couple has a daughter together.

On October 8, 2019, he became a YouTuber starring his own YouTube cooking show, Hiro-Meshi: Japanese Home-Style Cooking. One of the aired episode also guest starring his fellow actor from Kamen Rider Kabuto, Yūki Sato.

Filmography

Dramas

Films

Dubbing
The Incredible Hulk, Bruce Banner (Edward Norton)

Books
Kagerou (2010)

Photo books
Hiro (January 2007)
With You (November 2007)
Hiromode (December 2008)
Water Island: Peace (December 2009)

Music videos
Silent Scream Girl Next Door - Guest appearance and co-scriptwriter (2011)

References

External links
  
 

1984 births
Male actors from Tokyo
Japanese male film actors
Japanese male television actors
Keio University alumni
Living people
Writers from Tokyo
Japanese YouTubers
21st-century Japanese male actors